"Vermilion" is the second single from American heavy metal band Slipknot's third album, Vol. 3: (The Subliminal Verses). When the band plays the song live, they switch from their ordinary masks to "death masks"; each an actual cast of each member's face. However, during the All Hope Is Gone tour, only Craig and Paul wore their death masks for the song.

"Vermilion" features on the soundtrack for the 2004 film, Resident Evil: Apocalypse and plays during the end credits.

"Vermilion Pt. 2" is a continuation of the first part.

Background

"Vermilion Pt. 2"

"Vermilion Pt. 2" is the continuation of the story in Part 1. It features two acoustic guitars, a cello, a piano and Corey Taylor's baritone-styled vocals. The melody and the overriding theme run through both versions, making them integral to each other. It features on the Slipknot DVD, Voliminal: Inside the Nine and was performed by Taylor and Jim Root on radio station KISS-FM. The cover for "Pt. 2" consists of the "Vermilion" single cover, with a red and yellow tint, as opposed to the pink and gray tint of Pt. 1. A remix – "Vermilion Pt. 2 (Bloodstone mix)" – appears on the Underworld: Evolution soundtrack and the special edition of All Hope Is Gone.

"The differences (between the two tracks) are subtle — 'Vermilion Pt. 1' is about the enrapturing, the buildup, the anticipation and the neurosis," says Taylor. "'Part 2' is the aftermath, the pieces that have to be picked up later, and maybe the guilt of having lived through it".

Music videos
Both songs have music videos. "Pt. 1" was directed by Tony Petrossian and percussionist Shawn Crahan and "Pt. 2" was directed by Marc Klasfeld. Both videos were shot in Los Angeles in late August 2004. The actress is Janna Bossier. There is speculation over whether or not she was directly related to the band.

"Pt. 1" shows a girl living a tortured life in a crowded city. She walks in contortions and twists as people walk by in a blur, not noticing her pain. The only time she gets noticed is when she wears a Maggot Mask (specially designed for fans of the band) that makes the members of the band appear and dance with the girl. The first time she puts on the mask, the members appear in front of her and put on a white mask that enables their true faces to be seen for a couple of seconds. Then the band dance with her. A caterpillar is seen growing in the video; at the end scene it turns into a butterfly. The video ends with the girl screaming and tearing her hair out in misery.

"Pt. 2" shows the same girl; this time in a field peacefully sleeping. The wind begins to lift her and sway her back and forth. Eventually, the viewer realizes the girl is dead; however, she appears more peaceful than in the first video.

As of March 2023, the music videos for "Vermillion (Pt. 1)" and "Vermillion (Pt. 2)" have over 49 million and 72 million views on YouTube respectively.

The music video is available on the CD single, and the DVD Voliminal: Inside the Nine, released in 2006.

Track listing

EU/JP CD single

 includes music video "Vermilion"

EU cardboard sleeve CD single / 7" vinyl

EU 2nd CD single

US Euro Radio Edit Promo CD

NE Promo CD

US Full-Length Single Mix Promo CD

US Promo CD

Vermilion Pt. 2 Promo CD

Charts

Release history

References

2004 singles
2004 songs
Slipknot (band) songs
Roadrunner Records singles
Music videos directed by Marc Klasfeld
Music videos directed by Tony Petrossian
Song recordings produced by Rick Rubin
Songs written by Corey Taylor
Songs written by Jim Root
Songs written by Paul Gray (American musician)
Songs written by Joey Jordison